Constitutional Assembly elections were held in Indonesia on 15 December 1955. The Indonesian Provisional Constitution of 1950 had provided for the establishment of a democratically elected Constitutional Assembly to draw up a permanent constitution. In April 1953 the legislature passed the election bill. The elections for the People's Representative Council were set for September 1955, with the Constitutional Assembly elections three months later.

Results

References

 

Legislative elections in Indonesia
Indonesia
1955 in Indonesia
Sukarno
Liberal democracy period in Indonesia
1955-12 election
Election and referendum articles with incomplete results